Peter Korning (26 September 1902 – 1995), was a Danish chess player.

Biography
Peter Korning participated in the seven finals of Danish Chess Championships: the first performance took place in 1932, the last - in 1963. As a member of the Danish national chess team, he took part an international match with the East Germany national chess team.

Peter Korning played for Denmark in the Chess Olympiad: 
 In 1962, at first reserve board in the 15th Chess Olympiad in Varna (+1, =1, -6).

In later years, Peter Korning active participated in correspondence chess tournaments.

References

External links

Peter Korning chess games at 365chess.com

1902 births
1995 deaths
Danish chess players
Chess Olympiad competitors
20th-century chess players